Neotephritis thaumasta is a species of tephritid or fruit flies in the genus Neotephritis of the family Tephritidae.

Distribution
Mexico.

References

Tephritinae
Insects described in 1942
Diptera of North America